Thil-Manneville is a commune in the Seine-Maritime department in the Normandy region in north-western France.

Geography

Population

Places of interest
 The church of St. Sulpice, dating from the eleventh century.
 A sixteenth-century château.

See also
Communes of the Seine-Maritime department

References

Communes of Seine-Maritime